The Thirring–Wess model or Vector Meson model 
is an exactly solvable quantum field theory, describing the interaction of a Dirac field with a vector field in dimension two.

Definition
The Lagrangian density is made of three terms:

the free vector field    is described by

strictly positive; 
the free fermion field 
is described by

where the fermion mass  can be positive or zero.
And the interaction term is 

Although not required to define the massive vector field, there can be  also a gauge-fixing term 

for 

There is a remarkable difference between the case  and the case :  the latter  requires a field renormalization to absorb divergences of the two point correlation.

History
This model was introduced by Thirring and Wess as a version  of the Schwinger model with a vector mass term in the Lagrangian .

When the fermion is massless, the model is exactly solvable.

References

External links

Quantum field theory
Exactly solvable models